or  was an alleged suborganization of the  (DDSG) in pre-World War I Vienna, Austria, a shipping company for transporting passengers and cargo on the Danube. The DDSG still exists today in the form of the now-private companies DDSG-Blue Danube Schifffahrt GmbH (passenger transport) and the DDSG-Cargo GmbH. However, there is no evidence that the  ever existed.

As a compound word 
 is a compound word that serves as an example of the virtually unlimited compounding of nouns that is possible in many Germanic languages such as German or Dutch. According to the 1996 Guinness Book of World Records, it is the longest word published in the German language.

The German spelling reform of 1996 abolished the rule that compound words with triple consonants coalesce them into double consonants. The reform affects noun adjunct , itself a compound of Schiff ("ship") and Fahrt ("transportation"), which is now spelled  (with three ""s). A modern form of spelling would use 80 letters, . However, as the compound is (allegedly) a historical name, the original spelling with 79 letters is kept. That compound word contains the uncommon plural ;  ("electricity") is normally used only in the singular.

Long compound words are used sparsely in German conversation, but considerably more often than in English. A pre-World War I Danube steamship captain could be referred to as  more naturally than with the somewhat contrived title  ("Danube steamboating association captain").

Alternative word with 121 letters is unofficial clone of this word: "Oberdonaudampfschiffahrtselektrizitätenhauptbetriebswerkbauunterbeamtengesellschafthauptsitzeingangsbereichlufttemperatur"

Etymology

See also
 
 Longest word in English
 Noun adjunct

References

External links 
 A Collection of Word Oddities and Trivia
 DDSG-Cargo GmbH
 DDSG-Blue Danube Schifffahrt GmbH

German words and phrases
Long words